The 12th Bush Brigade is a military unit of the Argentine Army specialised in jungle and bush warfare. Its headquarters are at Posadas, Misiones Province.

Order of battle 
 12th Bush Brigade HQ (Posadas)
 9th Bush Infantry Regiment (Puerto Iguazú)
 29th Bush Infantry Regiment "Coronel Ignacio José Javier Warnes" (Formosa)
 30th Bush Infantry Regiment (Apóstoles)
 3rd Artillery Group (Paso de los Libres)
 12th Engineer Battalion (Goya)
 12th Jungle Cazadores Company (Puerto Iguazú)
 18th Bush Infantry Company (Bernardo de Irigoyen)
 12th Signal Squadron (Posadas)
 12th Intelligence Company (Posadas)
 12th Medical Company (Posadas)
 Logistic & Support Base "Resistencia" (Resistencia)
 12th Army Aviation Section (Posadas)

History 
In 1979 the Argentine Army created the 12th Bush Brigade. This unit was formed by:

 18th Infantry Regiment
 30th Infantry Regiment
 12th Artillery Group
 12th Armored Cavalry Exploration Squadron
 12th Company of Engineers
 12th Company of Construction Engineers
 12th Communications Company

In 1985 the 7th Infantry Brigade was dissolved and its dependent units became part of the 12th Infantry Brigade.

References

External links 

Brigades of Argentina
Misiones Province